The measurement of land in Punjab, India is an important aspect of agriculture and land management in the region. Punjab has a unique system of measuring land, typically done in units of bigha and acre. The measurements can vary slightly depending on the specific region and local customs.

The following are the basic measurements of land used in the Punjab region, divided between Indian and Pakistani Punjab and many parts of North India and Pakistan in ascending order. The measurement system is covered in detail in Punjab Weight and Measurement Act 1976.

History
In 2016, the Government of Punjab, Pakistan started using drones for the measurement of land.

Current standard measurement of farm land
A commonly used land measurement unit in Punjab is karam or square karam. Other units include the Sarsai and units listed.

All Units

1 karam X 1 karam = 1 sq. karam

5.5 feet X 5.5 feet = 30.25 sq. feet

30.25 square feet = 1  Sarsai 

9  Sarsai (Sq. Karam) = 1 Marla

36 Sarsai (Sq. Karam) = 1 Biswa

20 Marlas = 1 Kanal

20 Biswas = 1 Bigha

4 Kanals = 1 Bigha

8 Kanals = 1 Killa(Acre)

2 Bighas = 1 Killa(Acre)

2.5 Killas(Acres) = 1 Hectare

25 Killas(Acres) = 1 Murabba

This the current standard system of measurement of farm land.

Muraba-Killa-Bigha system
 one 'karam' is 5.5 ft
 one 'Sq. Karam' is 'One Sarsai' = (5.5 x 5.5) = 30.25 Sq. Feet
 one 'marla' is 9 (Sarsai) square karams = 9 x (5.5x5.5) = 272.25 Sq ft =30.25 Sq yard.
 one 'kanaal' is 20 marlas (5,445 sq ft) = 605 Sq.yard (Gajz)
 one 'bigha' is 20 biswa  (21,780 sq ft)
 one 'bigha' = 20 nisa
 one 'bigha' = 4 kanals
 5 'kanaals' (27225 sq. ft) = 5x605 = 100 marla = 3025 sq.yd. (gajz)
 one 'killa' is of 8 kanaals = 8x605 =  4840sq.yd. (gajz)
 one 'murabba' is 25 killas (1,089,000 sq ft = 25 acres)
 1 hectare is 2.47 Acres

Killa or acre measurements
A killa or acre is measured rectangularly, reckoned as an area 36 karams (198 ft) x 40 karams (220 ft) (43,560 square ft).  1
/5th of a killa or acre is known as bigha

 1 Karam = 5.5 feet = 1.83 
 
 '' or Gaj
 1  Yard or Gaj = 36 Inch = 0.91 Metre = 3 feet
 1 Sq Yard = 9 Sq Feet
 To convert Sq feet to Sq Yard = Divide by 9
 1 Marla is 25 Sq metres (272.25 sq feet)
 1 Kanal is 605 sq Yard (5445 sq feet)
 1 Acre is 4840 Sq Yard

Units of measurements in Sindh (Pakistan)
Following are the current units of measurement in Sindh residential as well as open / agricultural land.

 1 Athaas = 4 Acres
 1 Acre   = 2 Jarebs     = 43,560 Sq.ft  = 4,840 Sq.yd
 1 Jareb  = 20 Wiswa   = 21,780 Sq.ft  = 2,420 Sq.yd
 1 Wiswa = 1089 Sq.ft  = 121 Sq.yd  = 33  x 33 feet

Measurements of residential properties
Kothis (residential homes) and havelis (traditional mansions) are measured in marlas and kanaals. Most are two to four kanaals but the big ones can be anything from four to six kanaals.

Units of measurements in Haryana
Following are the current units of measurement as per HALRIS. Different areas have different size of Bigha, hence this system is no longer used since 1957 when it was replaced by the standardised Acre-Kanal-Marla based meter system.

Acre-Kanal-Marla system (currently used, standardised metre system)
 1 Karam = 66 inch 
 1 Sarsari = 1 Karam X  1 Karam
 9 Sarsari = 1 Marla
 20 Marla = 1 Kanal
 8 Kanal = 1 Acre (Ghumman)
 1 Acre = 36 Karam (north to south) X 40 Karam (east to west)
Bigha-Biswa system conversion to current Acre system
 1 Karam = 57.157 inch
 1 Biswansi = 1 Karam X 1 Karam 
 20 Biswansi =  1 Biswa
 20 Biswa = 1 Bigha
 4 Bigha और 16 Biswa = 1 Acre
Killa-Biswa-Bigha system (old system, no longer used since 1957)  
 1 Karam = 57.157 inch
 20 Biswansi =  1 Biswa
 20 Biswa = 1 Bigha 
 4 Bigha = 1 Killa  (40 Karam X 40 Karam)

Historic units of measurements
This measure was used in the revenue settlement of the districts of Delhi, Hisar, Rohtak, Ambala, Karnal, Fazilka, Ferozepur and Ludhiana during British Raj. This is now not used.

 1 Bigha = 0.20 acres or 4.8 Bighas = 1 acre

Historic measurements in Punjab
These are now outdated and have been standardised as above after the consolidation of land in Haryana and Punjab post-independence.

 one biswa = 15 Sq karams; 12 biswas = 1 kanaal (605 gaz)
 one bigha = 60 biswas - 3025 square yards - 2530 sq m

Consolidated areas
In all areas settled and consolidated on the basis of the standard measure of 66 inches i.e. Karam or Gatha:

 1 Sq. Karam or Sarsahi     3.0896352 Sq.yds say  30.56
 9 Sarsahies or 1 Marla    30.249999 Sq.yds say 30.25 Sq.yds.
 20 Marlas or 1 Kanal      604.99996 Sq.yds say 605 Sq.yds.
 160 Marlas or 8 Kanals   4839.99998 Sq.yds.say 4840 Sq.yds. (1 acre or 1 killa)

Non-consolidated areas
These areas have been all consolidated as per the standard system now. These are older measurements from during the British Raj prior to these areas were consolidated. In the areas consolidated on the basis of the local measUte and the non-consolidated areas of Amritsar, Gurdaspur, (except Shahpur Hill Circle and Chak Andar in Pathankot tehsil), Ferozepur (except Fazilka) and the erstwhile princely State of Faridkot. Also applicable for Lahore (Pakistan):

 1 Karam 60 inches
 1 Sq. Karam or Sarsahi              2.777777 Sq. yds.
 9 Sarsahies or 1 Marla             24.999999 Sq. yards say 25 Sq.yards.
 20 Marlas or 1 Kanal 499.9999 Sq. yards say 500 Sq.yards
 193.60 Marlas (9 Kanals1 Acre or 4840 Sq.yds 13 Marlas 5 Sarsahis)

Consolidated areas based on non-standard measures
In the areas consolidated on the basis of the local measure and the non-consolidated areas of Hoshiarpur, Jalandhar, Anandpur Sahib (Ropar) and the Shahpur hill Circle in Gurdaspur District during the British Raj.

 1 Karam 57.5 inches
 1 Sq. Karam or Sarsahi 2.5511188 Sq.yds.
 9 Sarsahies or 1 Marla 22.960069 Sq.yards say 22.96 Sq.yds
 20 Marlas or 1 Kanal   459.20138 Sq.yards say 459 Sq.yards.
 210.8 Marlas 10.54 Kanals 1 Acre or 4840 Sq.yds

Consolidated areas based on non-standard measures in erstwhile princely State of Kapurthala 
In the area consolidated on the basis of the local measure and the non-consolidated areas of the erstwhile princely State of Kapurthala:

 1 Karam 54 inches
 1 Sq. Karam or Sarsahi  = 2.25 Sq.yds.
 9 Sarsahies or 1 Marla  =  20.25 Sq.yards
 20 Marlas or 1 Kanal = 405 Sq.yards.
 239 Marlas(11 Kanals 19 Marlas) = 1 Acre or 4840 Sq.yds.

1 Karam or Gat ha x 1 Karam or Gatha
1 Sq. Karam or Biswansi 20 Biswansis
1 Biswa 20 Biswa 1 Satty 2

Meaning of Terms used in Mutation (Jamabandi/Farad

For Agricultural Land
 Gair Mumkin: Not useful for cultivation e.g mountainous etc
 Chahi: Irrigated by tubewells
 Khudkasht: Cultivated by self, not given to someone else.

See also

 Banjar, Jungle, Abadi, Shamlat, Gair Mumkin
 Barani, Nahri, Chahi, Taal
 Bigha
 Doab
 Haryana Land Record Information System
 Khadir and Bangar
 Khasra
 Patwari
 Shajra
 Zaildar

References

External links
 THE PUNJAB WEIGHTS AND MEASURES (INTERNATIONAL SYSTEM) ENFORCEMENT ACT, 1975
Units of measurement
Punjab
Economic history of India
Economic history of Pakistan
Metrication